Sylvester William Treinen (November 19, 1917 – September 30, 1996) was an American prelate of the Roman Catholic Church. He served as bishop of the Diocese of Boise in Idaho from 1962 to 1988.

Biography

Early life 
Sylvester Treinen was born in Donnelly, Minnesota, to William John and Kathryn (née Krausen) Treinen. He attended Crosier Seminary in Onamia from 1935 to 1941, and earned a Bachelor of Arts degree from St. Paul Seminary in Saint Paul in 1943.

Priesthood 
Treinen was ordained to the priesthood on June 11, 1946.

As a priest of the Diocese of Bismarck in North Dakota, Treinen was a curate in Dickinson from 1946 to 1950, and secretary to Bishop Vincent James Ryan and his successor, Bishop Lambert Anthony Hoch, from 1950 to 1953. He then served as a curate at the Cathedral of the Holy Spirit (1950–1957), chancellor of the diocese (1953–1959), and curate at St. Anne's Parish in Bismarck (1957–1959). From 1959 to 1962, he was pastor of St. Joseph's Parish in Mandan.

Bishop of Boise 
On May 23, 1962, Treinen was appointed the fifth Bishop of Boise in Idaho by Pope John XXIII. He received his episcopal consecration on the following July 25 from Bishop Hilary Baumann Hacker, with Bishops Peter William Bartholome and Lambert Hoch serving as co-consecrators. He attended all four sessions of the Second Vatican Council between 1962 and 1965, and worked to implement the reforms of the Council in the diocese.

Retirement and legacy 
After 26 years as Bishop of Boise, Treinen retired on August 17, 1988. He was succeeded by Tod David Brown. He served as the parish priest for St. Ann's Parish in Arco, Idaho after his retirement. Sylvester Treinen died in Missoula, Montana, at age 78.

References

External links
Roman Catholic Diocese of Boise

20th-century Roman Catholic bishops in the United States
Participants in the Second Vatican Council
Saint Paul Seminary School of Divinity alumni
1917 births
Roman Catholic bishops of Boise
1996 deaths
People from Mandan, North Dakota
Roman Catholic Diocese of Bismarck
Religious leaders from North Dakota
Catholics from North Dakota